Abrak-e Azhgil (also Romanized as Ābrāk-e Āzhgīl; also known as Ābrāk and Abrak Olya) is a village in Howmeh-ye Sharqi Rural District, in the Central District of Izeh County, Khuzestan Province, Iran. , its population was 936, in 173 families.

References 

Populated places in Izeh County